Nora is an unincorporated community located in the town of Cottage Grove, Dane County, Wisconsin, United States. Nora has existed since at least 1877, at which time it had a post office with tri-weekly mail service.

Notable people
Henry G. Klinefelter, farmer and politician, lived in Nora.

Notes

Unincorporated communities in Dane County, Wisconsin
Unincorporated communities in Wisconsin